Asura nubifascia is a moth of the family Erebidae. It is found in the north-western Himalayas.

References

nubifascia
Moths described in 1864
Moths of Asia